The Enchanted Valley is a 1948 American drama film directed by Robert Emmett Tansey and written by Frances Kavanaugh. The film stars Alan Curtis, Anne Gwynne, Charley Grapewin, Donn Gift, Joseph Crehan, Lash LaRue and Joe Devlin. The film was released on March 24, 1948, by Eagle-Lion Films.

Plot
The peaceful woodland home of a crippled boy and his grandfather is invaded by armed robbers. However, the natural setting and the boy's gentle personality have an unforeseen reforming effect on the criminals.

Cast          
Alan Curtis as Johnny Nelson
Anne Gwynne as Midge Gray
Charley Grapewin as Grandpa
Donn Gift as Timmy
Joseph Crehan as Chief Scott
Joe Devlin as Bugs Mason
Lash LaRue as Pretty Boy
John Bleifer as Menelli
Gene Alsace as Constable 
Jerry Riggio as Gangster
Jimmy the Crow as Jim the Crow 
Skipper the Dog as Skipper the Dog
Tubby the Bear as Tubby the Bear

References

External links
 

1948 films
1940s English-language films
American drama films
1948 drama films
Eagle-Lion Films films
Films directed by Robert Emmett Tansey
1940s American films